Sorcerer Lord is a turn based strategy-fantasy computer game published and developed by Personal Software Services. It was first released in 1987 for ZX Spectrum and Amstrad CPC, and during the next two years it was also released for Commodore 64, Atari ST, DOS, and Amiga.

Game

The game is set in the fictional land of Galanor. Galanor contains three human kingdoms, a forest kingdom of elves, a kingdom of barbarians and two kingdoms of mountain warriors. An invading army commanded by the evil sorcerer, the Shadowlord, is controlled by the computer. The player takes on the role of the Sorcerer lord and must use the forces of the Galanor Alliance under his command to counter this attack.

During the game, the human player and the computer take turns to recruit and move troops on a 2D map. The aim of the game for the Sorcerer Lord is to resist the initial attack of the Shadowlords' army and prevent him from holding any Galanor city or any magical Rune Rings for more of 11 days. The game is lost if the Shadowlord takes Galanor's capital city.

The strategy element of the game is enhanced by the unique abilities of soldiers from the different kingdoms. For example, mountain warriors have the advantage of a siege bonus and whilst fighting on mountainous terrain, and some higher ranking human leaders have a magic bonus. Movement bonuses also depend on the terrain; for example Elves can move faster in the forest, whereas barbarians can move faster in desert areas.

The game has a limit of 40 moves in the easy level, and fewer moves in the higher levels.

Reception
Ken St. Andre gave the game a positive review in Computer Gaming World, calling it a "fantasy wargamer's delight", albeit a very difficult game. He noted the exclusive use of the numeric keys for movement made it easy to make mistakes with. St. Andre also lamented the simple victory message upon winning or losing the game.

Footnotes

1987 video games
Amiga games
Amstrad CPC games
Atari ST games
Commodore 64 games
DOS games
Fantasy video games
Strategy video games
ZX Spectrum games
Personal Software Services games
Video games developed in the United Kingdom
Single-player video games